The Association of Registered Graphic Designers (RGD or simply RGD; formerly ARGD/ON is a non-profit, self-regulatoryprofessional design association with over 3,000 members. It serves graphic design professionals, managers, educators and students. Created in 1996 by an Act of the Legislative Assembly of Ontario (Bill Pr56), the Association is Canada's only accredited body of graphic designers with a legislated title and the second such accredited body of graphic designers in the world. RGD certifies graphic designers and promotes knowledge sharing, continuous learning, research, advocacy and mentorship.

Advocacy
RGD works to establish professional standards and innovative thinking within the graphic design industry. The association assumes an advocacy role for best practices for both graphic designers and the clients they work with. They focus on issues such as spec work and crowdsourcing, accessibility, sustainability, salaries and billing practices, pro bono work and internship guidelines.

RGD advocacy initiatives include:
 Supporting, defending and maintaining policies
 Promoting measures that broadly benefit members and the industry
 Increasing public awareness and disseminating information about industry best practices and the value of working with a Registered Graphic Designer (RGD)
 Arguing in favour of a new idea
 Speaking out on issues of concern
 Mediating, coordinating, clarifying and advancing a particular point of view
 Intervening with others on behalf of the profession

History
In 1956, Toronto-based designers Frank Davies, John Gibson, Frank Newfeld and Sam Smart formed the Society of Typographic Designers of Canada (TDC). The TDC was later renamed the Society of Graphic Designers of Canada (GDC) to reflect the wider interests of its members.

By 1984 many other design disciplines such as Architecture and Interior Design had been given Acts in Provincial Legislatures so that their respective associations could govern and grant their members exclusive professional designations. RGD's founders recognized the need to align Graphic Design with other design professionals. To ensure Graphic Design could also advance as an acknowledged profession the Association's founders decided to incorporate the Association of Registered Graphic Designers (RGD).

On April 25, 1996, Bill Pr56 was passed and Royal Assent was given to an Act Respecting The Association of Registered Graphic Designers by the Legislative Assembly of Ontario. Sponsored by Mrs. Margaret Marland, Member of Provincial Parliament and signed by the Honourable Hal Jackman C.M., O.Ont., O.ST.J., B.A., L.L.B., L.L.D., Lieutenant-Governor of the Province of Ontario.

In 1999 a separate Examination Board was established to administer the Registered Graphic Designers Qualification Examination, now referred to as the Certification Process for RGD.

Founders
Pauline Jarworski
Michael Large 
Jamie Lees 
Ivy Li RGD Emeritus
Helen Mah FGDC
Rod Nash RGD Emeritus
Albert Kai-Wing Ng O.Ont., RGD, FGDC
Rene Schoepflin RGD Emeritus
Robert Smith RGD
Philip Sung RGD Emeritus

Membership 
In order to obtain the Registered Graphic Designer (RGD) designation, designers must complete a Certification Process that includes an application to determine eligibility, a multiple-choice online test, and a virtual portfolio interview. The RGD designation signifies knowledge, experience and ethical practice, guaranteeing that a designer is professionally competent in the areas of accessibility, business, design principles, research and ethics.

RGD offers various forms of membership for professional practitioners, managers, educators and students in graphic design, and for persons in allied professions.

Conferences
RGD organizes three annual conferences: a two-day design conference called DesignThinkers, a one-day career development conference for students and emerging designers called Creative Directions, and a one-day Design Educators Conference.

Publications
RGD has published three editionsThe Business of Graphic Design: The RGD Professional Handbook'.
It has also published AccessAbility: A Practical Handbook on Accessible Graphic Designand publishes a biennial National survey of graphic design salaries & billing practices''.

Related organizations 
Société des designers graphiques du Québec (SDGQ)
AIGA
Design Council
Icograda

References

External links 
The Association of Registered Graphic Designers (RGD) Official Web Site 
DesignThinkers Official Web Site
CreativeEarners: National Survey of Salaries & Billing Practices in the Communication Design Industry
Accessibility

Graphic design
Design institutions
Communication design
Professional associations based in Canada
Organizations based in Ontario
Arts organizations established in 1996
1996 establishments in Ontario